In a compressible sound transmission medium - mainly air - air particles get an accelerated motion: the particle acceleration or sound acceleration with the symbol a in metre/second2. In acoustics or physics, acceleration (symbol: a) is defined as the rate of change (or time derivative) of velocity. It is thus a vector quantity with dimension length/time2. In SI units, this is m/s2.

To accelerate an object (air particle) is to change its velocity over a period. Acceleration is defined technically as "the rate of change of velocity of an object with respect to time" and is given by the equation

where
a is the acceleration vector
v is the velocity vector expressed in m/s
t is time expressed in seconds.

This equation gives a the units of m/(s·s), or m/s2 (read as "metres per second per second", or "metres per second squared").

An alternative equation is:

where
 is the average acceleration (m/s2)
 is the initial velocity (m/s)
 is the final velocity (m/s)
 is the time interval (s)

Transverse acceleration (perpendicular to velocity) causes change in direction. If it is constant in magnitude and changing in direction with the velocity, we get  a circular motion. For this centripetal acceleration we have

One common unit of acceleration is g-force, one g being the acceleration caused by the gravity of Earth.

In classical mechanics, acceleration  is related to force  and mass  (assumed to be constant) by way of Newton's second law:

Equations in terms of other measurements 
The Particle acceleration of the air particles  a in m/s2 of a plain sound wave is:

See also
Sound
Sound particle
Particle displacement 
Particle velocity

External links 
Relationships of acoustic quantities associated with a plane progressive acoustic sound wave - pdf

Acoustics